Aschach may refer to:

municipalities in Austria:
Aschach an der Donau 
Aschach an der Steyr
Aschach (river), a river in Austria